Dead Head is a four-part crime thriller scripted by Howard Brenton. It juxtaposed 1940s film noir style and costumes with contemporary London settings. It was directed by Rob Walker.

Plot
Petty criminal Eddy Cass (Lawson) receives a mysterious box that proves to contain the head of a young woman. This involves Cass in a conspiracy by the British security services to frame him for the crimes of a sadistic serial murderer of prostitutes.

Critical reception
The Times called it an "intriguing tale," though "neither a pleasant thriller to watch nor to contemplate"; while The Guardian thought it had "lashings of panache and style"; and writing in 1996, the Evening Standard called it the "only British series that came close to Twin Peaks jocular malice."

Home media
The series was released on DVD in the UK on 15 April 2013.

References

External links

Details of episodes Action TV Online - Dead Head episode guide Action TV episode guide

BBC television dramas
1980s British drama television series
1980s British television miniseries
English-language television shows
Television shows set in London
1986 British television series debuts
1986 British television series endings